Viktor Nikolayevich Sokolov (born 4 April 1962) is an officer of the Russian Navy. He currently holds the rank of vice-admiral, and since 2022 has served as commander of the Black Sea Fleet.

In 2016 as deputy commander Sokolov was in charge of a detachment of the Northern Fleet sent to take part in operations off the coast of Syria during the Russian intervention there. After several months carrying out operations, Sokolov was thanked for his services by the Chief of the General Staff Army General Valery Gerasimov, and returned with the taskforce to the fleet's homebases in Northern Russia. In January 2020 he left his post as deputy commander of the Northern Fleet to take up his new role as head of the N. G. Kuznetsov Naval Academy. It was announced in August 2022 during the 2022 Russian invasion of Ukraine that he had taken command of the Black Sea Fleet.

Early life and service
Sokolov was born on 4 April 1962. He entered the M.V. Frunze Higher Naval School in Leningrad on 1 August 1980, and graduated on 30 June 1985. His first assignment was with the Pacific Fleet as commander of the mine-torpedo warfare department of the Riga-class frigate SKR-61 from August 1985 to August 1987, followed by a posting as commander of the same department on the Natya-class minesweeper Yakor from August 1987 to October 1989. In that month he moved to command the mine-torpedo warfare department on the Sonya-class minesweeper BT-51, where he remained until December 1990. Sokolov's next posts were as assistant commander of his former vessel Yakor from December 1990 to December 1991, and then as commander of the Yakors sistership Zaryad from September 1992 until September 1993.

Sokolov began his naval service after graduating from the M.V. Frunze Higher Naval School in 1985, and was sent to serve in the Pacific Fleet. He rose from the position of commander of the mine-torpedo warfare department aboard a ship, to eventually command a minesweeper.

Staff appointments with the Pacific and Northern Fleets (1998-2013)
Sokolov was then appointed chief of staff of the 187th division of minesweepers from September 1993 until September 1994, and then as commander of the 81st division of minesweepers of the Pacific Fleet, from September 1994 until August 1995. He entered the N. G. Kuznetsov Naval Academy on 1 September that year, and graduated on 30 July 1998.

After completing the courses at the N. G. Kuznetsov Naval Academy in 1998 Sokolov became head of the operational management department at the Pacific Fleet's headquarters, followed by chief off staff and then commander of a brigade of surface ships.

Sokolov returned to the Pacific Fleet as head of the operational management department of the fleet's headquarters until June 2000, after which he became chief of staff of the 's 165th brigade of surface ships, and then the brigade's commander from September 2002 until September 2004. He was then once more on secondment for training purposes, studying at the Military Academy of the General Staff of the Armed Forces from September 2004 until July 2006, before again returning to the Pacific Fleet, this time in the post of deputy commander of the Primorsky Flotilla from August that year. In August 2013 he was appointed deputy commander of the Northern Fleet.

Northern Fleet and commander of Syrian operations (2013-2020)

In August 2013 he was appointed deputy commander of the Northern Fleet.

In mid 2016 Sokolov was assigned to command a detachment of the Northern Fleet, based around the aircraft carrier Admiral Kuznetsov and the battlecruiser Pyotr Velikiy, for operations off the coast of Syria during the Russian intervention there. The battlegroup left Severomorsk on 15 October 2016. On 15 November 2016 the Russian military leadership announced that the Admiral Kuznetsovs air wing had seen its first-ever combat use, during the military operations in Syria. In his assessment of combat operations, the commander of the Russian military operations in Syria, General-Colonel Andrey Kartapolov announced that Russian naval aviation had made 420 sorties, 117 of them at night, against 1,252 targets. In addition there had been over 750 sorties carrying out search and rescue, aviation transport support, air reconnaissance and maintaining air superiority. The frigate Admiral Grigorovich was reported to have launched Kalibr cruise missiles against ISIS targets on 15 November 2016. On 6 January 2017 Chief of the General Staff Army General Valery Gerasimov thanked Sokolov for his service in command of the naval task force, and instructed him to prepare for the withdrawal from the area of operations and to return to the fleet base at Severomorsk.

In September 2018 Sokolov took a leading role in the Ocean Shield exercises, which for the first time in Russia's modern history were held in the Mediterranean Sea. All four Russian fleets, as well as the Caspian Flotilla, were represented by a total of 25 ships and vessels, including two submarines, with more than three dozen aircraft and helicopters.

Head of Naval Academy (2020-2022)
Sokolov served as deputy commander of the Northern Fleet for almost seven years, before being appointed head of the N. G. Kuznetsov Naval Academy on 17 January 2020.

Commander of the Black Sea Fleet
It was announced on 17 August 2022 by RIA Novosti that Sokolov replaced Igor Osipov as commander of the Black Sea Fleet (BSF). This came after the latter's loss to the Ukrainian Armed Forces during the 2022 Russian invasion of Ukraine of the fleet's flagship, the cruiser Moskva, and the bombardment of the Crimean airfield of Saki (about 70 kilometres north of Sevastopol).

Awards and family
Over his career Sokolov has been awarded the Order "For Merit to the Fatherland" Fourth Class with Swords, the Order of Nakhimov, the Order of Military Merit and the Order of Naval Merit. He is married, with three sons.

References 

1962 births
Living people
Soviet Navy personnel
Russian admirals
Recipients of the Order of Military Merit (Russia)
Recipients of the Order of Naval Merit (Russia)
Recipients of the Order of Nakhimov
Recipients of the Order "For Merit to the Fatherland", 4th class
N. G. Kuznetsov Naval Academy alumni
Military Academy of the General Staff of the Armed Forces of Russia alumni